Avolon is an aircraft leasing company based in Dublin, Ireland. It was founded in May 2010 by Dómhnal Slattery and a team from RBS Aviation Capital, including John Higgins, Tom Ashe, Andy Cronin, Simon Hanson and Ed Riley. In December 2014, Avolon listed on the New York Stock Exchange (NYSE) under the ticker symbol AVOL. At listing, Avolon was the largest ever listing of an Irish founded company on the NYSE. In  September 2015, Avolon announced that Bohai Leasing Co., the Chinese leasing and financial services company affiliated with HNA Group, made a cash offer for 100% of Avolon's common shares at US$31 per share. In  January 2016, Avolon announced the completion of its acquisition by Bohai Leasing and the company's stock was delisted from the NYSE on 8 January 2016.  In November 2018, Avolon announced that Japanese financial institution ORIX Corporation had acquired a 30% stake in the business from its shareholder Bohai Capital, part of HNA Group.

In June 2021, Avolon announced the world's largest order for eVTOL aircraft, with an order for 500 VX4s from Vertical Aerospace.

In October, 2022, Avolon's founding CEO, Dómhnal Slattery, retired and was succeeded by founding CFO, Andy Cronin.

History

Launched in May 2010, Avolon was awarded ‘Equity Deal of the Year’ by Airfinance Journal in 2011. 
In January 2013, a joint-venture aircraft leasing business between Avolon and Wells Fargo was announced.
In July 2013, Avolon Capital Partners (ACP), the joint venture between Avolon and Wells Fargo, received all regulatory approvals and was formally launched. ACP took delivery of its first aircraft, a Boeing 737-800 NG on lease to Ryanair, in August 2013.
In July 2013, Avolon welcomed changes to Irish legislation announced by the Irish Government to allow Ireland adopt a new insolvency regime in relation to the financing of aircraft and aircraft engines, equivalent to the regime known as Alternative A under the Cape Town Convention. The Irish Department of Transport issued a statement at https://archive.today/20130830082746/http://www.dttas.ie/pressRelease.aspx?Id=818. 
In September 2013, Avolon announced the pricing and issue of US$636m Fixed Rate Asset Backed Notes by Emerald Aviation Finance. The proceeds were used by Emerald Aviation Finance to acquire a fleet of 20 aircraft from Avolon. Avolon, in turn, used the net proceeds of the sale of aircraft to refinance existing debt.
In October 2013, Avolon announced it successfully closed and funded an Emerald Aviation Finance US$636 million Asset Backed Securitisation to acquire 20 aircraft from Avolon. The proceeds were used to refinance existing debt and further extend Avolon's debt maturity profile. All 20 aircraft novations were completed within 60 days of closing.
In November 2013, Avolon issued a detailed analysis of the financing requirements for the airline industry's new aircraft deliveries over the coming decade. The results are published in a discussion paper entitled “Funding the Future – Matching the Demand of Aircraft with the Supply of Capital”.
In November 2013, Avolon announced it had commissioned a documentary on the history of Irish Aviation titled: "Pioneers and Aviators, A Century of Irish Aviation".
In December 2014, Avolon listed on the New York Stock Exchange under the ticker symbol AVOL. At listing, Avolon was the largest ever listing of an Irish founded company on the NYSE.
In March 2015, Avolon published an updated analysis of the key factors that influence the economic life of commercial jet aircraft building on the analysis issued in September 2012.
In September 2015, Avolon announced that Bohai Leasing Co., the Chinese leasing and financial services company affiliated with HNA Group, made a cash offer for 100% of Avolon's common shares at a price of US$31 per share.
In January 2016, Avolon announced the completion of its acquisition by Bohai Leasing and the company's stock was delisted from the New York Stock Exchange on 8 January 2016. Avolon then assumed control of Hong Kong Aviation Capital also owned by Bohai.
In July 2016, Avolon announced the acquisition of 45 aircraft from another lessor in what is the company's largest portfolio acquisition to date.
In April 2017, Avolon announced the completion of the acquisition of the CIT Group aircraft leasing business creating the world's third largest aircraft leasing company. Their new fleet totaled 850 aircraft with a value in excess of $43 billion as of 31 March 2017.
In May 2017, Avolon delivered the world's first Boeing 737 MAX 8 aircraft to Malindo Air.
In June 2017, Avolon announced an MoU with Boeing for 75 737 MAX 8 aircraft, together with 50 options, which increased the Avolon total fleet to over 900 aircraft.
In September 2018, Ireland's Taoiseach (Prime Minister), Leo Varadkar, opened Avolon's new 75,000 sq.ft. global headquarters at Number One Ballsbridge, Dublin.
In November 2018, Avolon announced that ORIX Corporation had acquired a 30% stake in the business from its shareholder Bohai Capital.
 In November 2018, Avolon delivered the world's first Airbus A330neo to Tap Airlines.
 In December 2018, Avolon announced an order for 100 Airbus A320neo family aircraft valued at US$11.5 billion; Avolon's largest ever aircraft order.
 In April 2019, Avolon announced it had raised US$2.5 billion of additional unsecured debt which resulted in an investment grade credit rating from Fitch, Moody's and S&P Global.
In June at the 2019 Paris Air Show, Avolon announced an order for 140 LEAP-1A engines from CFM International, valued at US$2 billion at list prices. The LEAP-1A engines will be used to power 70 Airbus A320neo family aircraft from its order book.
In June 2021, Avolon announced the world's largest order for eVTOL aircraft with an order for 500 VX4's from Vertical Aerospace. 
In October, 2021, Avolon announced a partnership with Israel Aerospace Industries (IAI), a leading independent freighter conversion company to become a major player in the global air cargo market. 
In July, 2022, Avolon announced its founding CEO, Dómhnal Slattery would retire during 2022 and be succeeded by founding CFO, Andy Cronin. Andy Cronin took up the role of CEO in October, 2022.

As of 30 September, 2022, Avolon had an owned, managed and committed fleet of 833 aircraft.

eVTOL order
In June 2021, Avolon announced an investment in the eVTOL company Vertical Aerospace along-side which Vertical announced an intention to list on the Stock Exchange as part of a SPAC transaction  Vertical announced orders for 1,000 eVTOLs including from American Airlines, Virgin Atlantic and Avolon. The single largest order for eVTOLs globally is the 500 order for the Vertical VX4 by Avolon. As of March 2022, Avolon had fully placed its order with airlines. 

Avolon has announced partnerships with GOL in Brazil, JAL in Japan, Gozen Holding in Turkey, Air Asia in Malaysia and Air Greenland to use the Vertical VX4 to create eVTOL ride-sharing businesses.

Aircraft leasing in Ireland

According to law firm Dillon Eustace, Ireland had been one of the pre-eminent jurisdictions for aircraft finance and leasing for almost 40 years. The Irish industry traces its roots back to the foundation of Guinness Peat Aviation in Shannon, County Clare in 1975.  A survey conducted by the  Federation of Aerospace Enterprises in Ireland estimated that aviation leasing companies in Ireland managed assets worth in the region of €82.9 billion in 2013.

It is estimated that in excess of US$100 billion of capital will be required every year to finance all the aircraft delivered by manufacturers and aircraft leasing is approaching 40% of the global aircraft financing market. The market has grown as more airlines have concluded that it is better to lease (rent) aircraft which provides for greater flexibility in the aircraft fleet. Some lessors expected the leased component share of the global aircraft fleet to rise to as much as 50% in the several years following 2012.

Publications

In April 2019, Avolon issued a White Paper entitled "Project i, Positioning Ireland at the Forefront of Global Startup Innovation" which assessed Ireland's start-up ecosystem when compared to best-in-class around the world. The report provides recommendations on how Ireland could close the gap with international best-practices; improve its global standing and provide the necessary support for entrepreneurs.

In July 2018, Avolon published a white paper titled ‘India, a 21st Century Powerhouse’, which provides an in-depth analysis of India's air travel market. The paper is divided in two parts; the first section details the factors impacting India's commercial airline sector, while the second part contains an analysis of the Indian aviation market, including a detailed breakdown of the major passenger markets, airline fleets and future growth projections. The paper forecast that the India's current passenger fleet will double to almost 1,100 aircraft by 2027 – with the total value of aircraft to be delivered over the coming ten years, at current list prices, projected to be $60 billion. The paper also highlighted that there is a shortfall of 300 aircraft in India's commercial aviation orderbook, which are required to meet the growth in demand over the next ten years. The demand is fuelled in large part by a forecasted annual growth of domestic and international passenger demand of 9.6% and 8.3% respectively.

In first half of 2017, Avolon published a White Paper series titled ‘The Land of Silk and Money’, which analysed the Chinese aviation market. The first part of this series, issued in March 2017, looked at the development, growth and gradual maturing of China's domestic airline industry and the key drivers of growth over the next decade. The second part, which was published in May 2017, analysed China's international inbound and outbound travel markets. The paper forecasted that Chinese airlines require an additional 3,200 additional aircraft by 2026, to meet future fleet requirements of China's airline industry. At the time of publication, over 50% of these had still to be ordered, including 1,150 narrowbody aircraft, 400 widebody aircraft and 150 regional jets.

In September 2012, Avolon published an analysis of commercial aircraft economic lives and retirement patterns.  The purpose was to test whether the current assumptions made by airlines, aviation investors and aircraft financiers, on the economic life of commercial jets - that aircraft should be depreciated over a useful life of approximately 25 years - remains valid.  The reason this analysis is so relevant today is that approximately 8,000 aircraft are due to be retired over the next 10 years. This is more than the total number of aircraft retired since commercial aviation began in the 1960s. The Avolon analysis considers how trends in aircraft retirement have changed over time and identifies key differences between  the behaviour of specific aircraft types. The paper also considers the likely impact on retirement trends and aircraft economic values of the retirement of newer fleets, including current Airbus A320 and Boeing 737NG aircraft.

In February 2013, Avolon published an analysis of, and investor guide to, the expected market impact of the transition to new generation Airbus (320Neo) and Boeing (737MAX) single aisle aircraft families. This was Avolon's second white paper on industry issues and considered how the transition from A320ceo/737NG aircraft to A320Neo/737MAX aircraft will influence the single aisle aircraft market over the rest of  the decade and beyond. The Avolon paper found that the effect of the Neo and Max models on the value of their predecessors will be limited by the sheer number of current-generation craft in use today and the high portion of the global aircraft fleet approaching retirement. The authors predict that sharper rises in passenger numbers in developing countries will fuel demand for both Neo and Max models, but also, importantly, current-generation aircraft as airlines seek to add capacity but find themselves at the end of long lines for the new models. Both Airbus and Boeing currently have record-high order backlogs, making the second-hand market an appealing option for fast-growing carriers.

In March 2015, Avolon published an updated analysis of the key factors that influence the economic life of commercial jet aircraft building on the analysis issued in September 2012. The	2015 analysis also addresses aircraft retirement and storage trends. The paper concluded that the patterns of retirement behaviour had not materially changed since the 2012 analysis, with the average aircraft retirement age stable at or around 25 years and more than 50% of fleets remaining in service beyond 25 years.

Documentary on Irish Aviation: 'Pioneers and Aviators'

In November 2013, Avolon announced it had commissioned a documentary on the history of Irish Aviation titled: "Pioneers and Aviators, A Century of Irish Aviation. The documentary tells the story of the remarkable, pioneering individuals whose vision, passion, successes and failures helped forge Ireland's unique aviation landscape. The documentary traces this story from its humble beginnings when Alcock and Brown made the first transatlantic flight, landing in a field in the West of Ireland, through the evolution of Aer Lingus and the development of airports at Foynes, Shannon and Dublin, the pivotal emergence of Tony Ryan, the meteoric rise and fall of GPA, the enduring dominance of Ryanair, culminating in a focus on the contemporary story of Ireland's leading role in aviation today.

The documentary Writer and Director, Alan Gilsenan, is a film-maker, writer and theatre director. His film work has appeared on the BBC, ITV, Channel 4, RTÉ, the History Channel and CNBC among others. The score for the documentary was written by renowned Irish composer Mícheál Ó Súilleabháin working with the RTÉ Concert Orchestra.

The premiere of the documentary took place in the Irish National Concert Hall, Dublin on Wednesday 22 January 2014.  The documentary was screened in two 52 minute episodes 
on RTÉ Television on 20 and 27 February 2014.

In June 2015,  Avolon launched a commemorative photographic book of the same name - Pioneers and Aviators, A Century of Irish Aviation. The book was formally launched by the Taoiseach Enda Kenny TD, together with Domhnal Slattery, Avolon CEO; Eamonn Brennan, Chief Executive of the Irish Aviation Authority; and Brigadier General Paul Fry, GOC of the Air Corps at an event at Casement Aerodrome, Baldonnel, Co. Dublin.

Europe's first MSc in Aviation Finance

In April 2016, Europe's first MSc in Aviation Finance was launched at the UCD Michael Smurfit Graduate Business School. Avolon, together with a number of other leading aircraft leasing firms, is an industry partner of the new master's degree.

The course is intended to sustain Ireland's position as the world's largest centre for aviation finance and leasing.

Initiatives with the Royal Hibernian Academy

In October 2015, as part of its corporate and social responsibility programme, Avolon announced two initiatives with the Royal Hibernian Academy (RHA): The Avolon Global Studio and Avolon Youthreach Programme. The programme was launched by Domhnal Slattery, Avolon CEO; Mick O’Dea RHA President; and Patrick T. Murphy, RHA Director.

Avolon Global Studio: With Avolon's support the RHA made a global call-out for an artist who will be awarded a 6-month studio placement, at the RHA during 2016, 2017 and 2018 with the first residency commencing in July 2016. This studio residency offers a once in a lifetime opportunity for an international, emerging artist to raise their profile on a global platform and to develop their practice within the environs of one of Ireland's leading contemporary art organisations. In April 2016 Avolon and the RHA announced the first participant of the Avolon Global Studio Programme would be Colombian artist, Adriana Salazar. The second artist to join the Avolon Global Studio Programme in 2017 was Iranian artist, Jinoos Taghizadeh. The third artist to receive the Avolon Global Studio Award will be selected from India.

Avolon Youthreach Programme: Collaborating with the national Youthreach scheme, the RHA will invite 6 young students, selected from submissions from the 160 Youthreach Centres nationwide, to participate in four workshops to increase their art skills, introduce them to visiting art galleries and art colleges and offer basic tools of criticism. As well as developing
practical skills, by working alongside a practicing artist, this opportunity will offer students the ability to explore the opportunities and challenges of being a professional
artist in Ireland today.

Awards
Avolon has received many industry awards, most recently the Airfinance Journal 2020 Lessor of the Year Award. Avolon was awarded Company of the Year and Aviation Leasing Achievement of the Year Award at the 2016 Aviation Industry Awards. Avolon's CEO, Domhnal Slattery, received an award for Outstanding Contribution to the Aviation Industry in 2016. Slattery was awarded the NYU Ireland House 2020 Lewis L. Glucksman Award for Leadership and the 2021 Ireland-US Council Award for Outstanding Achievement.

References

External links
Company homepage

Companies of the Republic of Ireland
Transport companies established in 2010
Aircraft leasing companies of the Republic of Ireland
2010 establishments in Ireland